ABHS may refer to:
 American Baptist Historical Society
 Amy Biehl High School, Albuquerque, New Mexico, United States
 Anchor Bay High School, Fair Haven, Michigan, United States
 Arkansas Baptist High School, Little Rock, Arkansas, United States
 Asquith Boys High School, Asquith, New South Wales, Australia

See also 
 ABH (disambiguation)